Gregor Bialowas (born 26 August 1959) is an Austrian weightlifter. He competed in the men's lightweight event at the 1984 Summer Olympics.

References

External links
 

1959 births
Living people
Austrian male weightlifters
Olympic weightlifters of Austria
Weightlifters at the 1984 Summer Olympics
Place of birth missing (living people)